Chang Pei-chih is a Taiwanese politician. He was the Political Deputy Minister of Finance until 17 February 2014.

Finance Political Deputy Ministry

Resignation
Chang resigned from his political deputy ministry on 17 February 2014 due to health reasons.

See also
 Ministry of Finance (Republic of China)

References

Living people
Taiwanese Ministers of Finance
Year of birth missing (living people)